In meteorology, eyewall replacement cycles, also called concentric eyewall cycles, naturally occur in intense tropical cyclones, generally with winds greater than , or major hurricanes (Category 3 or above). When tropical cyclones reach this intensity, and the eyewall contracts or is already sufficiently small, some of the outer rainbands may strengthen and organize into a ring of thunderstorms—a new, outer eyewall—that slowly moves inward and robs the original, inner eyewall of its needed moisture and angular momentum. Since the strongest winds are in a tropical cyclone's eyewall, the storm usually weakens during this phase, as the inner wall is "choked" by the outer wall. Eventually the outer eyewall replaces the inner one completely, and the storm may re-intensify.

The discovery of this process was partially responsible for the end of the U.S. government's hurricane modification experiment Project Stormfury. This project set out to seed clouds outside the eyewall, apparently causing a new eyewall to form and weakening the storm. When it was discovered that this was a natural process due to hurricane dynamics, the project was quickly abandoned.

Almost every intense hurricane undergoes at least one of these cycles during its existence. Hurricane Allen in 1980 went through repeated eyewall replacement cycles, fluctuating between Category 5 and Category 4 status on the Saffir-Simpson Hurricane Scale several times. Typhoon June (1975) was the first reported case of triple eyewalls, and Hurricane Juliette (2001) was a documented case of such.

History 

The first tropical system to be observed with concentric eyewalls was Typhoon Sarah by Fortner in 1956, which he described as "an eye within an eye". The next hurricane observed to have concentric eyewalls was Hurricane Donna in 1960.

Hurricane Beulah in 1967 was the first tropical cyclone to have its eyewall replacement cycle observed from beginning to end. Previous observations of concentric eyewalls were from aircraft-based platforms. Beulah was observed from the Puerto Rico land-based radar for 34 hours during which time a double eyewall formed and dissipated. It was noted that Beulah reached maximum intensity immediately prior to undergoing the eyewall replacement cycle, and that it was "probably more than a coincidence." Previous eyewall replacement cycles had been observed to decrease the intensity of the storm, but at this time the dynamics of why it occurred was not known.

As early as 1946 it was known that the introduction of carbon dioxide ice or silver iodide into clouds that contained supercooled water would convert some of the droplets into ice followed by the Bergeron–Findeisen process of growth of the ice particles at the expense of the droplets, the water of which would all end up in large ice particles. The increased rate of precipitation would result in dissipation of the storm. By early 1960, the working theory was that the eyewall of a hurricane was inertially unstable and that the clouds had a large amount of supercooled water. Therefore, seeding the storm outside the eyewall would release more latent heat and cause the eyewall to expand. The expansion of the eyewall would be accompanied with a decrease in the maximum wind speed through conservation of angular momentum.

Project Stormfury 

Project Stormfury was an attempt to weaken tropical cyclones by flying aircraft into them and seeding with silver iodide. The project was run by the United States Government from 1962 to 1983.

The hypothesis was that the silver iodide would cause supercooled water in the storm to freeze, disrupting the inner structure of the hurricane. This led to the seeding of several Atlantic hurricanes. However, it was later shown that this hypothesis was incorrect. In reality, it was determined, most hurricanes do not contain enough supercooled water for cloud seeding to be effective. Additionally, researchers found that unseeded hurricanes often undergo the eyewall replacement cycles that were expected from seeded hurricanes. This finding called Stormfury's successes into question, as the changes reported now had a natural explanation.

The last experimental flight was flown in 1971, due to a lack of candidate storms and a changeover in NOAA's fleet. More than a decade after the last modification experiment, Project Stormfury was officially canceled. Although a failure in its goal of reducing the destructiveness of hurricanes, Project Stormfury was not without merit. The observational data and storm lifecycle research generated by Stormfury helped improve meteorologists' ability to forecast the movement and intensity of future hurricanes.

Secondary eyewall formation 

Secondary eyewalls were once considered a rare phenomenon. Since the advent of reconnaissance airplanes and microwave satellite data, it has been observed that over half of all major tropical cyclones develop at least one secondary eyewall. There have been many hypotheses that attempt to explain the formation of secondary eyewalls. The reason why hurricanes develop secondary eyewalls is not well understood.

Identification
Qualitatively identifying secondary eyewalls is easy for a hurricane analyst to do. It involves looking at satellite or radar imagery and seeing if there are two concentric rings of enhanced convection. The outer eyewall is generally almost circular and concentric with the inner eyewall. Quantitative analysis is more difficult since there exists no objective definition of what a secondary eyewall is. Kossin et al. specified that the outer ring had to be visibly separated from the inner eye with at least 75% closed with a moat region clear of clouds.

While secondary eyewalls have been seen as a tropical cyclone is nearing land, none have been observed while the eye is not over the ocean. July offers the best background environmental conditions for development of a secondary eyewall. Changes in the intensity of strong hurricanes such as Katrina, Ophelia, and Rita occurred simultaneously with eyewall replacement cycles and comprised interactions between the eyewalls, rainbands and outside environments. Eyewall replacement cycles, such as occurred in Rita as it approached the Gulf Coast of the United States, can greatly increase the size of tropical cyclones while simultaneously decreasing in strength.

During the period from 1997–2006, 45 eyewall replacement cycles were observed in the tropical North Atlantic Ocean, 12 in the Eastern North Pacific and 2 in the Western North Pacific. 12% of all Atlantic storms and 5% of storms in the Pacific underwent eyewall replacement during this time period. In the North Atlantic, 70% of major hurricanes had at least one eyewall replacement, compared to 33% of all storms. In the Pacific, 33% of major hurricanes and 16% of all hurricanes had an eyewall replacement cycle. Stronger storms have a higher probability of forming a secondary eyewall, with 60% of category 5 hurricanes undergoing an eyewall replacement cycle within 12 hours.

During the years 1969-1971, 93 storms reached tropical storm strength or greater in the Pacific Ocean. 8 of the 15 that reached super typhoon strength (65 m/s), 11 of the 49 storms that reached typhoon strength (33 m/s), and none of the 29 tropical storms (<33 m/s) developed concentric eyewalls. The authors note that because the reconnaissance aircraft were not specifically looking for double eyewall features, these numbers are likely underestimates.

During the years 1949-1983, 1268 typhoons were observed in the Western Pacific. 76 of these had concentric eyewalls. Of all the typhoons that underwent eyewall replacement, around 60% did so only once; 40% had more than one eyewall replacement cycle, with two of the typhoons each experiencing five eyewall replacements. The number of storms with eyewall replacement cycles was strongly correlated with the strength of the storm. Stronger typhoons were much more likely to have concentric eyewalls. There were no cases of double eyewalls where the maximum sustained wind was less than 45 m/s or the minimum pressure was higher than 970 hPa. More than three-quarters of the typhoons that had pressures lower than 970 hPa developed the double eyewall feature. The majority of Western and Central Pacific typhoons that experience double eyewalls do so in the vicinity of Guam.

Early formation hypotheses

Since eyewall replacement cycles were discovered to be natural, there has been a strong interest in trying to identify what causes them. There have been many hypotheses put forth that are now abandoned. In 1980, Hurricane Allen crossed the mountainous region of Haiti and simultaneously developed a secondary eyewall. Hawkins noted this and hypothesized that the secondary eyewall may have been caused by topographic forcing. Willoughby suggested that a resonance between the inertial period and asymmetric friction may be the cause of secondary eyewalls. Later modeling studies and observations have shown that outer eyewalls may develop in areas uninfluenced by land processes.

There have been many hypotheses suggesting a link between synoptic scale features and secondary eyewall replacement. It has been observed that radially inward traveling wave-like disturbances have preceded the rapid development of tropical disturbances to tropical cyclones. It has been hypothesized that this synoptic scale internal forcing could lead to a secondary eyewall. Rapid deepening of the tropical low in connection with synoptic scale forcing has been observed in multiple storms, but has been shown to not be a necessary condition for the formation of a secondary eyewall. The wind-induced surface heat exchange (WISHE) is a positive feedback mechanism between the ocean and atmosphere in which a stronger ocean-to-atmosphere heat flux results in a stronger atmospheric circulation, which results in a strong heat flux. WISHE has been proposed as a method of generating secondary eyewalls. Later work has shown that while WISHE is a necessary condition to amplify disturbances, it is not needed to generate them.

Vortex Rossby wave hypothesis
In the vortex Rossby wave hypothesis, the waves travel radially outward from the inner vortex. The waves amplify angular momentum at a radius that is dependent on the radial velocity matching that of the outside flow. At this point, the two are phase-locked and allow the coalescence of the waves to form a secondary eyewall.

β-skirt axisymmetrization hypothesis
In a fluid system, β (beta) is the spatial, usually horizontal, change in the environmental vertical vorticity. β is maximized in the eyewall of a tropical cyclone. In this region, there is a small, but important β. This area is called the β-skirt. Outward of the skirt, β is effectively zero.

Convective available potential energy (CAPE) is the amount of energy a parcel of air would have if lifted a certain distance vertically through the atmosphere. The higher the CAPE, the more likely there will be convection. If areas of high CAPE exist in the β-skirt, the deep convection that forms would act as a source of vorticity and turbulence kinetic energy. This small-scale energy will upscale into a jet around the storm. The low-level jet focuses the stochastic energy a nearly axisymmetric ring around the eye. Once this low-level jet forms, a positive feedback cycle such as WISHE can amplify the initial perturbations into a secondary eyewall.

Death of the inner eyewall 

After the secondary eyewall totally surrounds the inner eyewall, it begins to affect the tropical cyclone dynamics. Hurricanes are fueled by the high ocean temperature. Sea surface temperatures immediately underneath a tropical cyclone can be several degrees cooler than those at the periphery of a storm, and therefore cyclones are dependent upon receiving the energy from the ocean from the inward spiraling winds. When an outer eyewall is formed, the moisture and angular momentum necessary for the maintenance of the inner eyewall is now being used to sustain the outer eyewall, causing the inner eye to weaken and dissipate, leaving the tropical cyclone with one eye that is larger in diameter than the previous eye.

In the moat region between the inner and outer eyewall, observations by dropsondes have shown high temperatures and dewpoint depressions. The eyewall contracts because of inertial instability. Contraction of the eyewall occurs if the area of convection occurs outside the radius of maximum winds. After the outer eyewall forms, subsidence increases rapidly in the moat region.

Once the inner eyewall dissipates, the storm weakens; the central pressure increases and the maximum sustained windspeed decreases. Rapid changes in the intensity of tropical cyclones is a typical characteristic of eyewall replacement cycles. Compared to the processes involved with the formation of the secondary eyewall, the death of the inner eyewall is fairly well understood.

Some tropical cyclones with extremely large outer eyewalls do not experience the contraction of the outer eye and subsequent dissipation of the inner eye. Typhoon Winnie (1997) developed an outer eyewall with a diameter of  that did not dissipate until it reached the shoreline. The time required for the eyewall to collapse is inversely related to the diameter of the eyewall which is mostly because inward directed wind decreases asymptotically to zero with distance from the radius of maximum winds, but also due to the distance required to collapse the eyewall.

Throughout the entire vertical layer of the moat, there is dry descending air. The dynamics of the moat region are similar to the eye, while the outer eyewall takes on the dynamics of the primary eyewall. The vertical structure of the eye has two layers. The largest layer is that from the top of the tropopause to a capping layer around 700 hPa which is described by descending warm air. Below the capping layer, the air is moist and has convection with the presence of stratocumulus clouds. The moat gradually takes on the characteristics of the eye, upon which the inner eyewall can only dissipate in strength as the majority of the inflow is now being used to maintain the outer eyewall. The inner eye is eventually evaporated as it is warmed by the surrounding dry air in the moat and eye. Models and observations show that once the outer eyewall completely surrounds the inner eye, it takes less than 12 hours for the complete dissipation of the inner eyewall. The inner eyewall feeds mostly upon the moist air in the lower portion of the eye before evaporating.

Evolution into an annular hurricane

Annular hurricanes have a single eyewall that is larger and circularly symmetric. Observations show that an eyewall replacement cycle can lead to the development of an annular hurricane. While some hurricanes develop into annular hurricanes without an eyewall replacement, it has been hypothesized that the dynamics leading to the formation of a secondary eyewall may be similar to those needed for development of an annular eye. Hurricane Daniel (2006) and Typhoon Winnie (1997) were examples where a storm had an eyewall replacement cycle and then turned into an annular tropical cyclone. Annular hurricanes have been simulated that have gone through the life cycle of an eyewall replacement. The simulations show that the major rainbands will grow such that the arms will overlap, and then it spiral into itself to form a concentric eyewall. The inner eyewall dissipates, leaving a hurricane with a singular large eye with no rainbands.

References

Further reading

Books

Web pages

Journal articles
 
 
 
 
 
 
 
 
 
 
 
 
 
 

Tropical cyclone meteorology